Port Macquarie, locally nicknamed Port, is a coastal city in the local government area of Port Macquarie-Hastings. The city is located on the Tasman Sea coast, at the mouth of the Hastings River, and at the eastern end of the Oxley Highway (B56). The city with its suburbs had a population of 47,973 in June 2018.

History

Port Macquarie sits within Birpai (Biripi, Birripai, Bripi, Biripai, Birrbay) country, and the Birpai people are recognised as the traditional custodians of the land on which Port Macquarie is located. Port Macquarie was long known to the Birpai people as Guruk. The Birpai Local Aboriginal Land Council provides positive support, information and responsible governance for the Aboriginal community, while also cultivating strong links with the broader community.

The site of Port Macquarie was first visited by Europeans in 1818 when John Oxley reached the Pacific Ocean from the interior, after his journey to explore inland New South Wales. He named the location after the Governor of New South Wales, Lachlan Macquarie.

Oxley noted that "the port abounds with fish, the sharks were larger and more numerous than I have ever before observed. The forest hills and rising grounds abounded with large kangaroos and the marshes afford shelter and support to innumerable wildfowl. Independent of the Hastings River, the area is generally well watered, there is a fine spring at the very entrance to the Port."

In 1821, Port Macquarie was founded as a penal settlement, replacing Newcastle as the destination for convicts who had committed secondary crimes in New South Wales. Newcastle, which had fulfilled this role for the previous two decades, had lost the features required for a place for dumping irredeemable criminals, that being isolation, which was lost as the Hunter Region was opened up to farmers, and large amounts of hard labor, which had diminished as the cedar in the area ran out and the settlement grew in size. Port Macquarie, however, with its thick bush, tough terrain and local aboriginals that were keen to return escaping prisoners in return for tobacco and blankets, provided large amounts of both isolation and hard labour to keep the criminals in control. Under its first commandant, Francis Allman, who was fond of flogging, the settlement became a hell, where the convicts had limited liberties, especially in regard to being in possession of letters and writing papers, which could get a convict up to 100 lashes.

The penal settlement lasted from April 1820 to c. 15 August 1830. The settlement peaked with 1500 convicts by 1825 but by 1828 this had fallen to 530. The commanders of the settlement were:
Francis Allman, March 1821–1824
Captain Rolland succeeded Allman in April 1824
Lieutenant Carmac, 1824
Henry Gillman in January 1824–
Archibald Clunes Innes 1826–1827

Because of the lack of liberties of the settlement, Governor Ralph Darling quickly sent there many 'specials' or literate convicts with a decent education who had voiced negative views about him. Later on in the settlement's history, in the 1830s, disabled convicts started to arrive. One-armed men would be grouped together and required to break stones, men with wooden legs would become delivery men, and the blind would often be given tasks during the night which they performed more skilfully than those with sight.

In 1823 the first sugar cane to be cultivated in Australia was planted there. The region was first opened to settlers in 1830 and later on in the decade the penal settlement was closed in favour of a new penal settlement at Moreton Bay. Settlers quickly took advantage of the area's good pastoral land, timber resources and fisheries.

St Thomas's Anglican Church is a Georgian building designed by Francis Greenway and built, under the supervision of military engineer Lieutenant T. Owen, by convicts from 1824 to 1828. This church is among the oldest in Australia and one of the few remaining convict-built churches. Inside there are red cedar box pews that were peculiar to that period in church architecture. The Walker pipe organ is the only one of its type in the southern hemisphere. The castellated tower permits excellent views of the coastline, town and river. This church is now classified by the National Trust of Australia (NSW) and has been registered on the National Estate heritage list.

In 1830 Major Archibald Clunes Innes built Lake Innes House which grew over the next decade into a luxurious establishment and attracted many notable visitors. It is now a ruin and is managed by the NSW Parks and Wildlife Service.

In 1840 the "Wool Road" from the Northern Tablelands was under construction to enable wool and other produce to be shipped from the port. Port Macquarie was declared a municipality in 1887, but the town never progressed as a port owing to a notorious coastal bar across the mouth of the river.

Over 20 shipwrecks occurred in the Tacking Point area before a lighthouse was designed by James Barnet and erected there in 1879 by Shepard and Mortley. Tacking Point Lighthouse is classified by the National Trust of Australia (NSW).

Writer Louis Becke was born and grew up in the town in the 1860s and later recalled those days, saying Port Macquarie was an,

In the 1970s, Grace Easterbrook, a retired secretary from Scotland, began a campaign against the high-rise developments which were multiplying up the coast. She led a group of citizen activists in lobbying against a large development on Windmill Hill and other efforts to conserve the coast. In 1974, residents of Port Macquarie requested that the Builders Labourers Federation place a green ban against the construction of high rise buildings on beach head and water front. Easterbrook died in 1984, before the culmination of her conservation efforts, the beautiful coastal walks, were completed.

Severe flooding occurred in March 2021 when the Hastings River flooded during a severe weather event affecting much of New South Wales.

Heritage listings 
Port Macquarie has a number of heritage-listed sites, including:
Port Macquarie First Burying Ground
Port Macquarie Government House Site
Hastings Historical Society Museum
Overseers' Cottages Remains
Old Port Macquarie Courthouse
Port Macquarie Second Burying Ground
St Thomas Anglican' Church
Lake Innes House Ruins

Population 
In 1847, the population was 819, of whom 599 were males and 220 were female. The gender disparity was probably due to the penal station there at the time.

The estimated urban population of Port Macquarie was 47,973 as at June 2018, having grown 1.8% on prior year and from 41,496 over the prior decade. Port Macquarie is expected to be the fastest growing place in New South Wales. The town is expected to grow from an estimated 43,655 people in 2009 to 58,888 in 2027.

According to the 2016 census of Population, there were 45,379 people in Port Macquarie.
 Aboriginal and Torres Strait Islander people made up 3.9% of the population.
 80.2% of people were born in Australia. The most common countries of birth were England 4.6%, New Zealand 1.5%, Scotland 0.6%, Germany 0.5% and South Africa 0.4%.
 90.2% of people only spoke English at home. Other languages spoken at home included Mandarin 0.2%, Spanish 0.2%, French 0.2% and German 0.2%.
 The most common responses for religion were No Religion 26.0%, Catholic 24.5% and Anglican 23.0%.

General 
Port Macquarie is a coastal destination, known for its extensive beaches and waterways. The town is also known for its koala population, being the home to the Billabong Zoo (a wildlife park and koala breeding center) and the Koala Preservation Society's Koala Hospital, caring for koalas injured through bushfire, dog attacks and collisions with vehicles.

In 2016 the war memorial was relocated from Town Green to its original location at the intersection of Clarence and Horton Streets.

The residential suburbs stretch to Lighthouse Beach in the south, Thrumster to the west and to North Shore, on the northern bank of the river. In July 2010, Sovereign Hills began development in the west.

Port Macquarie was found to be the least affordable smaller market in Australia by Demographia's 2013 International Housing Affordability Survey.

Sister and friendship cities
Handa, Aichi, Japan

Suburbs and localities

Central business district 
Port Macquarie's central business district contains two shopping centres, many specialty stores, a marina, and the starting point for the 9 km coastal walk, a scenic walking trail that travels from Westport Park, through the Port Macquarie CBD to Tacking Point Lighthouse. The Glasshouse, a centrally located arts, conference and entertainment centre, includes a visitor-information facility. Bus services link the town with Laurieton, Wauchope, Kempsey, Lake Cathie and Bonny Hills.

The main shopping centre Port Central, sits next to the Glasshouse, a hub of culture and entertainment, boasting a 594-seat theatre, performance and art studio, gallery, Visitor Information Centre, shop and theatre bar.

One of Australia's largest internet finance comparison websites, Credit Card Compare, now called Finty, was founded in Port Macquarie by Andrew and David Boyd.

Transit Hill
Transit Hill to the south is crowned by telecommunication towers. The district is the site of two arterial roads which provide a direct link between Lighthouse Beach and Port Macquarie CBD. The main intersection of Pacific and Kennedy Drive is situated midway up Transit Hill. It is an area of high-priced real estate owing to ocean and city views. Transit Hill borders Lighthouse Beach, Dahlsford, Shelly Beach and Waniora.

Sovereign Hills
Sovereign Hills is a newer development in Port Macquarie, between the locality of Thrumster to the east, and the Pacific Highway to the west. Its development is currently managed by the Lewis Land Group. Most recent press releases have suggested that the area will have around 2500 homes when complete.

St Joseph's Regional College moved from its previous location on Warlters Street to Sovereign Hills in 2009. A town centre is planned for opening in 2019, and has been advertised to initially include a supermarket, pharmacy and a café. The local organisation Hastings Co-Op has announced that they will operate the supermarket to be built in this new town centre.

Beaches and attractions 
Beaches (in order from north to south) are: North Shore, Town Beach, Oxley Beach, Rocky Beach, Flynns Beach, Nobbys Beach, Shelly Beach, Miners Beach (unofficial clothing-optional) and Lighthouse Beach. Only Town, Flynns and Lighthouse Beaches are staffed by Surf Life Saving Clubs. Lighthouse Beach is patrolled at only the northern end. Dogs can be walked off-leash at Lighthouse Beach, south of Watonga Rocks, excluding sections at the northern end and Nobbys Beach.

Sea Acres National Park is adjacent to Shelly Beach and contains a Visitor Centre with access controlled rainforest boardwalk.

Climate

Port Macquarie has a humid subtropical climate (Cfa) with warm, humid summers and mild winters, with frequent rainfall spread throughout the year. In winter and spring, the town can occasionally be affected by foehn winds due to its leeward position of the Great Dividing Range. The town receives 118.9 clear days annually. In addition, it is the northernmost city on the coast to receive southerly busters, although they are not as intense as those in the southern coast.

Previous site, Port Macquarie (Hill Street). This site is now closed and data is now taken from the airport AWS which is located 4.4 km away.

Educational facilities 

Preschools/Child Care
Bangalay Child Care Centre Port Macquarie
Blooming Kids Early Learning and Long Day Care Centre
Columba Cottage Early Learning Centre
Fernhill Road Preschool and Long Day Care Centre
Goodstart Early Learning Port Macquarie
Hastings Preschool and Long Day Care Centre
Joey's House Early Education Centre
Lighthouse Child Care Centre
Moruya Drive Child Care Centre
Port Macquarie Community Preschool
Port Macquarie Early Learning Centre
Portside Preschool and Long Day Care Centre
St Agnes Early Education Centre
St.Joseph's Family Services
St.Joseph's Preschool and Long Day Care Centre

Primary schools

Public schools 
 Port Macquarie Public School
 Hastings Public School
 Tacking Point Public School
 Westport Public School

Catholic schools 
 St. Joseph's Primary School
 St. Peter's Primary School
 St. Agnes' Primary School

Other private schools 

 Port Macquarie Adventist School
 Heritage Christian School (Kindergarten to Year 12)
 St Columba Anglican School (Kindergarten to Year 12)

High schools

Public schools 
 Hasting Secondary College
 Port Macquarie Campus (formerly Port Macquarie High School)
 Westport Campus (formerly Westport High School)

Catholic schools 

 St. Joseph's Regional College
 MacKillop College (formerly St. Paul's High School & MacKillop Senior College)
 Newman Senior Technical College (Year 11 & 12)

Private schools 

 Heritage Christian School (Kindergarten to Year 12)
 St Columba Anglican School (Kindergarten to Year 12)

Tertiary educational facilities 

Three universities and TAFE offer a range of courses in Port Macquarie, as well as other vocational institutions. Charles Sturt University opened a new campus in 2016, and offers courses in Creative Industries, Psychology, Medical Imaging and Medical Radiation Science, Environmental Sciences, Paramedicine, Social Work, Business Studies and Accounting, Criminal Justice Studies, Exercise Sports Science and Physiotherapy, among others. Nursing will be offered from 2020. There is a TAFE campus for further qualifications and pathway options into higher education. Courses are also offered by the University of Newcastle through the TAFE campus. The University of New South Wales has run a clinical school from Port Macquarie since 2007, and now runs the complete six-year medical degree from this Campus. The growth in tertiary educational options in the region has been in response to significant research designed to retain young people in the area and contribute to the growth of the educational standards for the Hastings region.

Transport links 

Port Macquarie Airport ( west of town) has regular flights to Sydney with QantasLink (5 times daily) and Virgin Australia (twice daily), and to Lord Howe Island with QantasLink and Brisbane with Virgin Australia.

There is no railway station in Port Macquarie. However, the Port Macquarie CBD and northern suburbs are served by the nearby Wauchope railway station (17 km west of town), and the southern suburbs including satellite towns of Lake Cathie and Laurieton are served by Kendall railway station ( southwest). Both stations are on the North Coast Line operated by NSW TrainLink with 3 services daily in each direction towards either Newcastle and Sydney or northwards to Grafton, with travel time to Sydney of approximately 6 hours. There is a railway-operated connecting bus service available from Wauchope railway station to the Port Macquarie CBD.

Road access is via the Pacific and Oxley Highways. The Pacific Highway lies between Port Macquarie and Wauchope, and is the main road for tourists travelling from coastal areas.

Four significant nearby road projects have been completed in recent years to help with road traffic issues in the area:
 Pacific Highway – Karuah to Bulahdelah section 2 and 3 (Karuah to Bulahdelah section 1 – Completed December 2006).
 Pacific Highway – Bulahdelah Bypass The Bulahdelah bypass/upgrade fills the only missing Pacific Highway link between Hexham and Port Macquarie after the opening of the Karuah to Bulahdelah section(s) 2 and 3 and the Coopernook to Herons Creek upgrade.
 Pacific Highway – Coopernook to Herons Creek.
 The Oxley Highway upgrade, from a 2 lane undivided road to a 4-lane divided carriageway, from Wrights Road to the Pacific Highway.

These four projects are all from the AusLink funding on a joint basis from the Commonwealth and the state of NSW making equal financial contributions.

Annual events 
Notable events held in the Port Macquarie area include:
 ArtWalk (variable dates mid year)
 Mountain Bike Festival of Australia – Port Macquarie (first weekend of June)
 Festival of the Sun (December)
 NSW Touch State Cup (first weekend in December)
 NSW Touch Junior State Cup (February)
 Port Macquarie Kart Racing Club's Pacific Coast Titles
 Hello Koalas Festival, established 2017, is the world's first festival celebrating the koala and is held annually in September. Port Macquarie has the largest koala population on the east coast of Australia.

Notable people 
 Ryley Batt, OAM (born 1989), wheelchair rugby player
 George Louis Becke (1855–1913) author
 Phil Carey (born 1960), rugby league player
 Nick Cummins (born 1987), rugby union player
 Nabil Elderkin (born 1982) attended  Port Macquarie High School. Film and music video director and photographer having worked with Kanye West, Kendrick Lamar, Frank Ocean, John Legend, Jay Z and Nicki Minaj. First photographer to shoot Kanye West and works with him and Kim Kardashian to this day. 
 Michael Eppelstun, first Australian to be world bodyboarding champion (1993)
 Damian King, world bodyboarding champion (2003, 2004)
 Isaac Levido (born 1982/1983), political consultant
 James Magnussen (born 1991), Olympic swimming medallist
 Lachlan Morton (born 1992), road cyclist for EF Education First Pro Cycling
 Aleyce Simmonds (born 1986), country music singer-songwriter
 Nancy Wake (1912–2011) lived here from c. 1985 until c. 2001
 Garth Walden (born 1981), racing driver

References

External links 

 Port Macquarie-Hastings Council
 Port Macquarie tourist information

 
Towns in New South Wales
Mid North Coast
Coastal towns in New South Wales
Port Macquarie-Hastings Council
Green bans